Diane Shalet (February 23, 1935 – February 23, 2006) was an American Broadway and television character actress.  She was perhaps best known for her recurring role as Ms. Hawkins in the drama Matlock. She made a guest appearance on The Monkees in the season-two episode, "The Fairy Tale", as the Fairy of the Locket (January 8, 1968).

Career
Shalet's Broadway credits include Tartuffe (1965), The Changeling (1964), But For Whom Charlie (1964), and After The Fall (1964). She also had roles in the touring companies of Bloomer Girl, Brigadoon, Connecticut Yankee, and Oklahoma.

Films in which Shalet appeared included The Reivers (1969), Deadhead Miles (1972), and The Last Tycoon (1976). She also made over 200 guest appearances on episodic television shows. They include Bonanza, Born Free (TV series), and Cagney & Lacey.

For 14 years, Shalet taught at UCLA; she also was a founder of the Actors and Writers Lab in Manhattan. A life member of The Actors Studio, she was the author of the 1994 novel Grief in a Sunny Climate, which a review in The New York Times described as a "deceptively silly story to disguise some serious lessons about sorrow and dependency." The book received first prize for fiction writing at the Santa Barbara Writers Conference.

Personal life
Shalet was married to actor Michael Strong, with whom she appeared in an episode of the television detective series Harry O.

Death
Shalet died in Palm Springs, California, on February 23, 2006, her 71st birthday.

Filmography
The Reivers (1969) - Hannah
Deadhead Miles (1973) - Donna James
The Last Tycoon (1976) - Stahr's Secretary
The Incredible Hulk (1981) - Nurse Judy Gray

References

External links 

Diane Shalet at the Internet Off-Broadway Database
New York Times Obituary

1935 births
2006 deaths
American stage actresses
American television actresses
20th-century American novelists
American women novelists
20th-century American women writers
20th-century American actresses
21st-century American women